Alireza Mirshafian (born March 8, 1978) is an Iranian football midfielder who currently plays for Paykan in the Iran Pro League.

Club career
Mirshafian joined Tractor Sazi F.C. in 2008

 Assist Goals

References

1978 births
Living people
Iranian footballers
Association football midfielders
Tractor S.C. players
Pas players
Esteghlal Ahvaz players
Saba players
Persian Gulf Pro League players
Azadegan League players